Derren Brown (born 27 February 1971) is an English mentalist, illusionist, painter, and author. He began performing in 1992, making his television debut with Derren Brown: Mind Control in 2000, and has since produced several more shows for stage and television. His 2006 show Something Wicked This Way Comes and his 2012 show Svengali won him two Laurence Olivier Awards for Best Entertainment. He made his Broadway debut with his 2019 stage show Secret. He has also written books for both magicians and the general public.

Brown does not claim to possess any supernatural powers; conversely, his acts are often designed to expose the methods of those who do assert such claims, such as faith healers and mediums. He often begins live performances by stating that his results are achieved through "magic, suggestion, psychology, misdirection, and showmanship".

Early life 
Derren Brown was born in the Croydon area of London on 27 February 1971, the son of Chris and Bob Brown. He was raised in the nearby area of Purley, which he described as "the epitome of middle-class suburbia". He has a brother nine years his junior. He was privately educated at Whitgift School in Croydon, where his father was a swimming coach, before going on to study law and German at the University of Bristol. While there, he attended a hypnotist show by Martin S Taylor, which inspired him to turn to illusion and hypnosis as a career. As an undergraduate, he started working as a conjuror, performing the traditional skills of close-up magic in bars and restaurants. In 1992, he started performing stage shows at the University of Bristol under the stage name Darren V. Brown; the "V" stood for "Victor".

Career

Performance
Brown cites magician and comedian Jerry Sadowitz, whom he met at the International Magic shop in Clerkenwell, London, as being instrumental in his rise to stardom. Sadowitz put him in touch with H&R publishers and Objective Productions, a production company founded by television magician Andrew O'Connor. This gave him his breakthrough show, Mind Control (2000), and his work went on to become their first award-winning product. After several further shows with Objective, Brown set up his own company Vaudeville Productions with former Objective executives Michael Vine, Andrew O’Connor, and Paul Sandler, in order to produce his own shows as well as other projects with other performers. Its first show was Brown's TV special, Pushed to the Edge.

Other appearances 
In 2008, Brown made a brief cameo in the supernatural drama series Crooked House. An interview with Brown was featured in Richard Dawkins' 2009 two-part documentary series The Enemies of Reason. Brown explained various psychological techniques used by purported psychics and spiritual mediums to manipulate their audiences. The most notable was cold reading, a technique which he discusses extensively in his book Tricks of the Mind. Some video footage was also used from his TV special Messiah. As part of Channel 4's 3D season in 2009, Brown presented Derren Brown's 3D Magic Spectacular. The show was not a new special from Brown; instead, he was the presenter for a number of other magicians and clips that were shown. However, he did include one extract taken from a 2006 episode of Trick of the Mind in which he found an object that had been hidden in the streets of Venice by a volunteer.

In January 2011, to celebrate 10 years since his first television appearance, Channel 4 held a special "Derren Brown Night". As well as re-showing The Heist (which had won a recent poll of favourite Brown specials) and one of his Enigma live shows, the channel screened a special documentary called Derren Brown: Behind the Mischief. It was a personal and candid film about Brown which included the story of how he met his co-writer (who was featured in Seance), his mother's feelings about his involvement in the Russian Roulette special, and an emotional visit back to his old school, university, and bars/pubs where he first began his career. Celebrity contributors included Matt Lucas, Jo Whiley, Stephen Merchant, and Simon Pegg. In January 2013, he was featured in a Channel 4 Deal or No Deal special, where he appeared to have predicted all the correct boxes to win the big jackpot of £250,000. That same year, he appeared in a comedy sketch at the beginning of an 8 Out of 10 Cats Does Deal or No Deal special.

In January 2014, Brown appeared as himself in the Sherlock episode "The Empty Hearse", as part of a theory regarding how the title character faked his own death. On 9 November 2018, he appeared as a guest on The Joe Rogan Experience to promote his Netflix special Sacrifice.

In February 2021, Brown appeared in a trailer for the horror video game Little Nightmares II, in which he discussed the nature of nightmares while some of the monsters featured in the game appeared around him.

Controversies 

Many of Brown's shows have generated controversy. In 2007, BBC News listed two of his shows (Russian Roulette and Seance) in a list of examples of Channel 4's "legacy of controversy". In 2013, he said, "Controversy has never interested me for its own sake. It's always been about doing stuff that feels dramatic."

Public complaints that Russian Roulette was distasteful, made light of suicide, and promoted gun culture were ultimately rejected by Ofcom on the basis that the context (a post-watershed magic show) was enough and that the warnings given were sufficient. Additionally, the use of a 15-minute time delay ensured no viewer would have seen the result of any mistake. The police had also warned that the show might inspire copycat acts.

Seance received 487 complaints to Channel 4 and 208 to Ofcom, making it the third most complained about show in UK history. Most were from church groups and came before transmission, i.e. before Brown revealed during the broadcast that his attempt to contact the dead was a hoax. The show was ultimately cleared of any wrongdoing.

The GMB union criticised Heist on behalf of security workers, arguing it was "irresponsible and insensitive" in light of increased attacks on staff. Channel 4 responded by arguing that it was made "very clear that attempting any form of robbery was criminal behaviour."

An episode of Trick or Treat caused charity Cats Protection to complain and news reports to label Brown a "cat killer", after he appeared to convince someone to press a button even though they thought it would electrocute a kitten inside a metal box. Brown responded by arguing they had misunderstood the trick (the box wasn't wired up), and he "wasn’t glorifying cruelty to cats. People would have been hard-pressed to recreate the electrocution device at home even if they wanted to." Another episode which saw someone hypnotised into thinking they had been killed in a car crash after not wearing a seatbelt was criticised by a road safety charity, who alleged it trivialised the issue.

Ofcom received 11 complaints and began an investigation relating to the safety of a scene in Hero at 30,000 Feet, in which the subject was shown chained to a railway line in order to escape from an oncoming train.  The complaint is listed on Ofcom's Weekly Broadcast Report, Tuesday, 28 September 2010 to Monday, 4 October 2010, and Ofcom's Broadcast Bulletin, Issue Number 167. The show is listed in the "Other Programmes Not in Breach" (p. 38) category of their Ofcom's Broadcast Bulletin, Issue Number 168, without any explanation as to why it was decided that it is not in breach.

Self-proclaimed psychic Joe Power, the subject of episode 1 of Derren Brown Investigates ("The Man Who Contacts the Dead"), complained to Ofcom about being misled and treated unfairly, and that the programme "presented, disregarded or omitted material facts". He also alleged he had received threats from sceptics and had to move home because of it. Ofcom rejected his complaint on the basis that Power had been fully apprised of the sceptical nature of the programme, and his actions had been presented fairly.

Brown has faced allegations of using stooges in his work. Viewers complained that the subject of Apocalypse was an actor, pointing to his CastingCallPro account as evidence. Brown dismissed these allegations as conspiracy theories and then responded directly, calling them untrue and hurtful.

Methods

Suggested methods 
Brown states that he uses a variety of methods to achieve his illusions including traditional magic/conjuring techniques, memory techniques, hypnosis, body language reading, cognitive psychology, cold reading, and psychological, subliminal (specifically the use of PWA – "perception without awareness"), and ideomotor suggestion. Others additionally ascribe methods to him that he denies, ranging from the pseudoscience neuro-linguistic programming (NLP) to paid actors.

In an interview in New Scientist in 2005, when asked how he "acquired his psychological skills", Brown says that he learnt skills as a hypnotist, which he was not sure how to apply until he started performing close-up magic. When asked whether he is able to detect lies, Brown claimed to be able to read subtle cues such as micro-muscle movements that indicate to him if someone is lying. Concerning his apparent success at hypnotising people, he stated that he can normally spot a suggestible type of person and chooses that person to be his participant. He believes that the presence of a television camera also increases suggestibility.

Several authors have claimed that Brown uses neuro-linguistic programming (NLP) in his act which "consists of a range of magical 'tricks', misdirection and, most intriguing, setting up audiences to provide the response that he wishes them to provide by using subtle subliminal cues in his conversation with them". In response to the accusation that he unfairly claims to be using NLP whenever he performs, he wrote, "The truth is I have never mentioned it outside of my book." He does have an off-stage curiosity about the system, and discusses it in the larger context of hypnotism and suggestion. In his book Tricks of the Mind, he mentions that he attended an NLP course with Richard Bandler, co-creator of NLP and mentor of Paul McKenna. He also describes the NLP concept of eye accessing cues as a technique of "limited use" in his book Pure Effect. The language patterns which he uses to suggest behaviours are very similar in style to those used by Richard Bandler and by the hypnotist from whom Bandler learnt his skill, Milton H. Erickson. Brown also mentions in Tricks of the Mind that NLP students were given a certificate after a four-day course, certifying them to practise NLP as a therapist. A year after Brown attended the class, he received a number of letters saying that he would receive another certificate, not for passing a test (as he discontinued practising NLP following the course), but for keeping in touch. After ignoring their request, he later received the new certificate for NLP in his mailbox, unsolicited.

Actual versus suggested methods 
Brown often claims to reveal the methods by which he achieves his tricks, however this is typically an additional layer of misdirection, as the stated methods are not the methods that he uses. The perception by his audience that he uses deep psychological insights typically aids the misdirection required for his tricks. He therefore relies on an array of techniques to prevent audiences from deducing the techniques he has used. This has led to criticism that his presentation as a sceptic is misleading, since his performances encourage belief in pseudoscience. For example, after performing a trick in which he appeared to predict lottery numbers, his demonstrated explanation included using the Wisdom of Crowds, but it has been theorised that the actual method relied on split-screen video. This has been interpreted as undermining sceptic efforts to reduce the magical thinking that mentalist performances can promote.

In a Daily Telegraph article published in 2003 Simon Singh criticised Brown's early TV appearances, arguing that he presented standard magic and mentalism effects—such as the classic ten-card poker deal trick—as genuine psychological manipulation. On Brown's television and live shows he often appears to show the audience how a particular effect was created—claiming to use techniques such as subliminal suggestion, hypnosis, and body language reading. Singh's suggestion is that these explanations are dishonest. Furthermore, Singh took exception to the programme's website being categorised under Channel 4's "Science" section. The mini-site was moved to "Entertainment" for later series.

In his 2006 book Tricks of the Mind, Brown wrote, "I am often dishonest in my techniques, but always honest about my dishonesty....I happily admit cheating, as it's all part of the game" and claimed to never use actors or "stooges" in his work without informing the viewers, calling it "artistically repugnant and simply unnecessary". However, in an October 2010 interview Brown conceded that Singh may have had a point, explaining that at the start of his television career "I was overstating the case, overstating my skills. I thought there'll only be one show, there'll never be a repeat, so I might as well go for it."

Personal life
Although Brown's parents were not practising Christians, they sent him to Bible classes from the age of five because they believed it was the "right thing to do". In an effort to deal with issues of self-esteem and sexuality, he became an evangelical Christian throughout his teenage years in order to present himself as confident and asexual; by his 20s, he had decided that his belief in Christianity had no basis, and he became an atheist. By 48, Brown revealed in an interview with Russell Brand that he had since regained his belief in spirituality. He states that this was based on his own coming of age and need to "surrender" his ego to the possibility of "transcending to something larger than the self." He came out as gay at the age of 30. He revealed that he was dating a designer named Marc at the time, though they later ended their eight-year relationship.

Since 2004, Brown has been the patron of the Parrot Zoo Trust in Friskney, Lincolnshire. In an interview with LeftLion magazine, he said, "I'm a big fan of parrots. I think they're fascinating creatures. Many of them live for longer than us humans and it's interesting to me the way they learn to mimic human voices even though they don't really comprehend what they're saying."

Works

Shows

Television series

Television specials

Stage shows

Broadcast on television

DVD releases

Books 
Brown has written six books: Absolute Magic, Pure Effect, Tricks of the Mind, Confessions of a Conjuror, Happy, and A Book of Secrets, and released books of his street photography and painted portraiture. The first two books are intended solely for practitioners of magic and mentalism, whilst his books Tricks of the Mind, and Confessions of a Conjuror are aimed at the general public. He has also written a book exploring the history and philosophy of happiness; Happy: Why More or Less Everything is Absolutely Fine.

Absolute Magic, subtitled A Model for Powerful Close-Up Performance, is not so much about magical methodology as about how magicians can make their performances magical; it is written in a variety of styles: sometimes humorous, sometimes serious. He warns against an act that conveys the feeling of "Here are some tricks I've bought" and urges magicians to make their performances experiential and memorable by involving the audience. In some respects a lot of what he says is evocative of the content of Darwin Ortiz's Strong Magic but his book expresses it in the context of his experiences, performance style and theories of how performance should be.

Pure Effect is a more traditional book of trickery and technique and offers an insight into some of the methods that Brown employs, and offers a starting point for development for the reader's own use.

Brown's first two books were intended for magicians; they were written before his fame. He has said that he pulled them from the market when he found that non-magicians would bring them to his shows for autographs. He says he felt bad because, "...they're spending a lot of money on those things and...if they wanted to find out how I was doing the TV shows it wasn't really answering that question."

Tricks of the Mind is Brown's first book intended for the general public. It is a wide-ranging book in which Brown reveals some of the techniques he uses in his performances, delves into the structure and psychology of magic and discusses hypnosis. He also applies his insight to the paranormal industry, looking at the structure of beliefs and how psychology can explain why people become 'true believers'. He also offers autobiographical stories about his own experiences as a former Christian, and discusses his scepticism about religion, allegedly 'psychic' phenomena and other supernatural belief systems.

Confessions of a Conjuror was published by Channel 4 Books in October 2010. It is a mix of autobiography and humorous observation told mostly through footnotes and diversions while Brown describes performing a single card routine for a group of people at his old restaurant gig.

Happy: Why More or Less Everything is Absolutely Fine was published on 22 September 2016 by Bantam Press.. A condensed version of the book, entitled A Little Happier: Notes for reassurance, was published on 15 October 2020.

On 2 September 2021, A Book of Secrets: Finding Comfort in a Complex World was published by Bantam Press.

Other productions and publications 
Brown co-presented two web-based series for Channel 4; The Science of Scams and The Science of Attraction. In The Science of Scams, a number of videos were placed on YouTube purporting to show various kinds of paranormal phenomena such as ghosts, telekinesis and a tarot card reading. In a second series of videos, Brown and his co-presenter Kat Akingbade explained what was actually happening, exposing each as a specially created scam. The Science of Attraction was co-presented by Brown, Akingbade and Charlie McDonnell. The shows examined the physical and psychological factors that can influence our feelings of attraction to other people, especially those of the opposite sex. The series featured a number of experiments designed to show how these factors can be influenced.

Brown has recorded some audio extracts from Tricks of the Mind. In them he expounds on the three subjects essential to his performance—Magic, Memory, and Hypnosis. The extracts last around 40 minutes each, disclosing tips and techniques Brown uses in his acts (as well as day-to-day) and narrating the highlights of his book.

The Devil's Picturebook is a near 3-hour home-made video. The first half explains in detail some classic card routines from his earlier career as a conjurer, all of which rely on sleight of hand, misdirection and audience management. The second looks at psychological card routines and shows a distinct move towards mentalism, for which he is now known. It is an instructional video for aspiring magicians and not an entertainment piece. For this reason, it was available only to practitioners through a password-protected "magicians only" area of his website. The clue to the password tells you that the word itself begins with T and is a type of palming trick.

International Magic Presents: The Derren Brown Lecture is an 80-minute lecture DVD of close-up mentalism and subsequent discussion of various aspects of Brown's performance. Again, this product is not intended for general consumption but is directed at magicians and mentalists only.

In 2007, Brown performed in the short film Medium Rare.

In 2008, Brown made a guest acting appearance in BBC Four's Crooked House as Sir Roger Widdowson.

In 2008, Brown provided caricatures for "The QI 'F' annual".

In 2009, a book, Portraits, was released containing a selection of Brown's paintings and bizarre caricatures of celebrities.

In 2010, Brown appeared in a special Comedy Gala for Channel 4 and Great Ormond Street Hospital. He appeared with Kevin Bishop, who played his jealous annoying twin 'Darren'.

Thorpe Park ride 
Brown created a new virtual reality dark ride at the Thorpe Park amusement park, which opened on 8 July 2016. "Derren Brown's Ghost Train" was set aboard an old train carriage in an abandoned warehouse. The experience lasted around 13-15 minutes and was Thorpe Park's most expensive ride experience. The ride had live-action actors and holograms while passengers were strapped in wearing VR headsets. In 2017, the attraction added new experiences to the train and 'Rise of the Demon' to the name. The ride closed in 2022; it was rebranded and rethemed as Ghost Train, a project without Brown's involvement.

Playing cards 
In 2019, Brown collaborated with playing card company Theory11 on a deck of cards that are sold on the company's website.

Awards and nominations

References

External links 

  – official site
 
 

 
1971 births
Alumni of the University of Bristol
English atheists
English magicians
English sceptics
Gay entertainers
British gay writers
British hypnotists
Laurence Olivier Award winners
LGBT magicians
English LGBT writers
Living people
Mentalists
People educated at Whitgift School
People from Purley, London
Former evangelicals
English former Christians
Academy of Magical Arts Magician of the Year winners